Republic Square may refer to:

Argentina
Plaza de la República (Buenos Aires),  Argentina

Armenia
Republic Square, Yerevan

Czech Republic
Náměstí Republiky, Prague

France
Place de la République (Lyon)
Place de la République, Paris
Place de la République (Strasbourg)

Georgia
Rose Revolution Square, until 2005 Republic Square in Tbilisi

Germany
 Platz der Republik (Berlin)
 Platz der Republik (Hamburg)
 Platz der Republik (Mönchengladbach)

Italy
 Piazza della Repubblica, Florence
 Piazza della Repubblica (Novara), see Novara Cathedral
 Piazza della Repubblica, Rome

Kazakhstan
 Republic Square, Almaty

Malta
Republic Square, Valletta
Republic Square, Tarxien, see List of squares in Malta
Republic Square, Żejtun, see List of squares in Malta

Mexico
Plaza de la República, Mexico City, site of the Monumento a la Revolución

Montenegro
Republic Square, Podgorica

Nicaragua
Plaza de la Revolución (formerly Plaza de la República), Managua

Serbia
 Republic Square, Belgrade
 Republic Square, Novi Sad
 Republic Square, Niš
 Republic Square, Niška Banja
 Republic Square, Smederevo
 Republic Square, Sombor
 Republic Square, Požarevac
 Republic Square, Vranje

Slovenia
Republic Square, Ljubljana

Spain
Plaça de la República, Barcelona

United States
Republic Square (Austin) in Austin, Texas, see Thomas W. Ward

See also
Náměstí Republiky (disambiguation)
Platz der Republik (disambiguation)
Praça da República (disambiguation)
Plaza de la República (disambiguation)
Piazza della Repubblica (disambiguation)
Place de la République (disambiguation)
Republic Plaza (disambiguation)
Trg Republike (disambiguation)